Ban Khlo station is a railway station located in Du Subdistrict, Kanthararom District, Sisaket Province.

References 

Railway stations in Thailand
Sisaket province